Proteodes clarkei is a species of moth in the family Depressariidae. It is endemic to New Zealand and has been collected in locations around Manapouri in alpine habitats. Both the male and female adults of the species are brightly coloured but the female is brachypterous, that is it has reduced wing size in comparison to the male. Adults have been recorded as being on the wing in January and February.

Taxonomy 
This species was first described by Alfred Philpott in 1926 using specimens collected by Charles Clarke and Stewart Lindsay in January in the Hunter Mountains at an altitude of around 4000 ft. Philpott named the species after Clarke. The male holotype is held at the Canterbury Museum.

Description 

Philpott described the male of the species as follows:

He went on to describe the female as follows:

The female of the species is brachypterous.

Distribution 

This species is endemic to New Zealand. It has been collected at its type locality of the Hunter Mountains in Fiordland, including Mt Titiroa in early February. The Hunter Mountains are near Manapouri.

Behaviour 
Adults of this species is on the wing in January and February.

Habitat
This species can be found in a rare ecosystem - granite sand plains in the alpine zone of the South Island.

References

Moths described in 1926
Moths of New Zealand
Depressariidae
Endemic fauna of New Zealand
Taxa named by Alfred Philpott
Endemic moths of New Zealand